Dipu Mirdha (born 9 May 1999) is an Indian professional footballer who plays as a winger for Indian Super League club NorthEast United.

Club career

Sunrise AC 
Mirdha was named 2019 GSA RG Baruah Super Division League Player of the Tournament, scoring 8 goals in the process playing for Sunrise AC.

NorthEast United 
In February 2020, Mirdha signed for Indian Super League club NorthEast United after scoring 6 goals in the Khelo India Youth Games for the U-21 Assam football team. On 20 February he made his debut against Hyderabad in the Indian Super League, in a 5–1 loss. He came on as a 58th-minute substitute for Fanai Lalrempuia. Five days later, he made his only other appearance of the season against Chennaiyin, which ended in a 2–2 draw.

Kenkre 
In September 2021, Mirdha moved to Kenkre ahead of the 2021 I-League Qualifiers. On 5 October, he made his debut against Kerala United, which ended in a 2–1 comeback win.

Return to NorthEast United 
In December 2021, Mirdha returned to NorthEast United on a reported five-year deal that will keep him at the club until 2027. He scored his first goal for the club against Army Green in the Durand Cup. By the end of the Durand Cup, he scored two goals for NorthEast United. Mirdha was promoted to the first-team for the 2022–23 Indian Super League season for his scintillating performances.

Career statistics

Club

Honours
Kenkre
 I-League 2nd Division Runners-up: 2021

NorthEast United B
 Sarbananda Singha Cup Runners-up: 2021

 GSA C Division: 2022

References

External links 
 

Living people
Indian footballers
NorthEast United FC players
Association football forwards
People from Golaghat
Footballers from Assam
1999 births